The United Church of Christ in Japan (UCCJ;  Nihon Kirisuto Kyōdan, or Kyōdan for short) is the largest Protestant denomination in Japan. It is a union of thirty-three diverse Protestant denominations forcibly merged by the Japanese wartime government on June 24, 1941. The UCCJ, which is a Japanese Independent Church, is a member of the World Council of Churches (WCC).

Currently, the church has some about 200,000 members and 1,725 congregations served by 2,189 pastors.

History

Second World War

Upon promulgation of the Religious Organizations Law that forced the merger of all the Protestant churches in Japan to unite, a declaration of church unity was made at a mass meeting of Christians from all parts of Japan on 17 October 1940. The Kyōdan was established at a Founding General Assembly held at the Fujimicho Church (founded by Uemura Masahisa) on 24–25 June 1941.

After 1945
With the establishment of religious freedom by the Allied Occupation Forces in 1946, many groups left the Kyōdan to reestablish their prewar denominational identities. The most significant departures were the Anglican Church in Japan, the Japan Lutheran Church, Japan Baptist Convention, Japan Holiness Church, Japan Assemblies of God, Reformed Church in Japan (the Reformed Church in Japan did not exist as a denomination in the prewar era ) plus numerous smaller evangelical churches.

After the 1970s
The controversy had both theological and non-theological roots, some tending back into an earlier period. The union's wartime origin and the church's self-acknowledged complicity in the war were called into question. While the 1954 Confession of Faith, a doctrinal statement, clarified the postwar church's identity (there are debates about this）, many cite the 1967 Confession of Responsibility During World War II as recovering the church's integrity, by openly dealing with the church's wartime role.

Twenty-six UCCJ missionaries now serve in eleven overseas lands in a variety of ministries, a heritage begun when the first postwar missionary was sent to Brazil in 1957.

United Church of Christ in Japan permits openly gay and lesbian pastors to act as ministers.

Seminaries and theological colleges

Tokyo Union Theological Seminary
Doshisha University
Kwansei Gakuin University
Tohoku Gakuin University
Seinan Gakuin University
Seiwa College
Tokyo Bible Seminary
Japan Biblical Theological Seminary
Rural Mission Human Right Seminary 農村伝道神学校

Notable members
Kenji Goto (d. 31 January 2015) – journalist beheaded by the Islamic State of Iraq and the Levant

References

External links

UCCJ English website

 
1941 establishments in Japan
Christian organizations established in 1941